Eritrean Airlines is the national airline of Eritrea. Based at Asmara International Airport, it is wholly owned by the government of Eritrea. Scheduled service had been discontinued since 2008, and the airline operated only a few hajj flights every year. The airline was restarted under new management in 2011. In 2011, Nasair, a privately owned company, merged with government-owned Eritrean Airlines, to form Nasair Eritrea. Eritrean Airlines has been banned from flying into the European Union (EU) since December 2012.

History
It also acted as sales agent for other major airlines flying to Eritrea. In May 2002, it was decided to expand into airline services. In , an ex-EgyptAir 14-year-old Boeing 767-300ER was leased from Boeing and used to start operations between Asmara and Amsterdam. It was the first aircraft the airline took possession of, and was named Queen Bee. The lease of the first Boeing 767 seems to have been replaced by an Airbus A320 in 2006 and then replaced again with a Boeing 757 in early 2007. It was again replaced with a DC-9 in late 2007, ending up with an MD-83.

In April 2003, Eritrean Airlines started regular services between Asmara and Frankfurt, Milan, Nairobi and Rome. In 2004, the airline added Amsterdam as another destination and in 2005, services began to Djibouti and Dubai. Meanwhile, the Nairobi route was dropped. By 2006, the flights to Amsterdam had been dropped while flights to Milan remained seasonal. On 21 September 2006, Eritrean Airlines entered an accord with the Government of Pakistan to start direct flights between Eritrea and Pakistan. Eritrean Airlines received permission from the Civil Aviation Authority of Pakistan to start two flights a week each for Karachi and Lahore. Eventually service was operated via Dubai four times per week on each route, with full fifth freedom passenger and cargo traffic rights on the Dubai - Pakistan sectors.

The airline announced in 2008 that it was commencing seasonal services to Bamako, for Hajj travellers. Flights to Djibouti were discontinued at the end of 2008 due to renewed tensions along the two countries' border, and flights to Frankfurt were cancelled in the summer of 2009.

In June 2011, a senior Eritrean Foreign Ministry official said that the United States government had applied pressure prohibiting companies from leasing aircraft to Eritrea. He stated that Washington was resorting to such illegal acts as part of its hostile attempts of stiffening anti-Eritrea sanctions, at a time when the Eritrean government was engaged in buying and leasing of passenger planes under new Pakistani management.

Eritrean Airlines resumed operations on 16 July 2011. It also introduced a new livery on the first A320 received, which was used for the inaugural service to Dubai and Lahore. A second A320 was added in October, and flights to Karachi were launched. The carrier also planned to restore domestic services once the currently stored Dornier fleet was made airworthy. Long-term fleet plans may include introduction of wide body aircraft like the Airbus A330, as well as new Boeing 737s to replace the A320.

EU ban
Since December 2012, Eritrean Airlines has been included in the European Commission list of airlines barred from flying into the EU.

Destinations
, Eritrean had scheduled service to four destinations: Cairo, Addis Ababa, Khartoum, and Jeddah. As of February 2023, no flights are scheduled on those routes.

Fleet

Current fleet
The Eritrean Airlines fleet in July 2020 consisted of a Boeing 737-300. Eritrean is also said to have six Dornier aircraft, which are stored in Eritrea.

Former fleet

The airline previously operated the following equipment:
 Airbus A319-100
 Airbus A320-200
 Boeing 737-300
 Boeing 757-200
 Boeing 767-200ER
 Boeing 767-300ER
 McDonnell Douglas MD-80

See also 
 List of air carriers banned in the European Union
 Transport in Eritrea

References

External links

 Eritrean Airlines (Archive)

Airlines of Eritrea
Airlines banned in the European Union
Airlines established in 1991
Organisations based in Asmara
Government-owned airlines
1991 establishments in Eritrea